Speed Star may refer to:
 Speed Star (album), a 2009 album by Aya Hirano
 "Speed Star" (Lead song)
 "Speed Star" (Garnidelia song)

See also
 Speedstar